No P. or D. is the debut studio album by German indie electronic band Ms. John Soda. It was released on 7 October 2002 by Morr Music.

Reception

Pitchfork critic Eric Carr highlighted the "serene vocals" and "rich, deep melodies" present throughout No P. or D., describing the album as a "fantastically accessible" record that "can be enjoyed with as much or as little of the brain as desired." Tiny Mix Tapes reviewer Wolfman wrote that he "couldn't help but feel a deep sense of inner peace" while listening to the album. Jaime Vázquez of AllMusic cited Ms. John Soda's ability to create "mood" as their "greatest strength", adding: "They make recordings that can be left on as background, but the arrangements hold up to scrutiny and reveal new subtleties with each listen." In a less enthusiastic review, Stylus Magazines Kareem Estefan was critical of the band's "cautious approach" and deemed the album "good, but inessential." At the end of 2003, No P. or D. was listed by Pitchfork as the year's 45th best album.

Track listing

Personnel
Credits are adapted from the album's liner notes.

Ms. John Soda
 Micha Acher
 Stefanie Böhm

Additional musicians
 Thomas Geltinger – drums
 Gerhard Gschlößl – trombone
 Carl Oesterhelt – percussion
 Ulrich Wangenheim – flute

Production
 Michael Heilrath – mastering
 Ms. John Soda – production
 Mario Thaler – production

Design
 Jan Kruse – cover and booklet artwork
 Gerald von Foris – photography

References

External links
 

2002 debut albums
Ms. John Soda albums
Morr Music albums